In differential geometry, a spin structure on an orientable Riemannian manifold  allows one to define associated spinor bundles, giving rise to the notion of a spinor in differential geometry.

Spin structures have wide applications to mathematical physics, in particular to quantum field theory where they are an essential ingredient in the definition of any theory with uncharged fermions.  They are also of purely mathematical interest in differential geometry, algebraic topology, and K theory. They form the foundation for spin geometry.

Overview
In geometry and in field theory, mathematicians ask whether or not a given oriented Riemannian manifold (M,g) admits spinors. One method for dealing with this problem is to require that M has a spin structure. This is not always possible since there is potentially a topological obstruction to the existence of spin structures. Spin structures will exist if and only if the second Stiefel–Whitney class w2(M) ∈ H2(M, Z2) of M vanishes. Furthermore, if w2(M) = 0, then the set of the isomorphism classes of spin structures on M is acted upon freely and transitively by H1(M, Z2) . As the manifold M is assumed to be oriented, the first Stiefel–Whitney class w1(M) ∈ H1(M, Z2) of M vanishes too. (The Stiefel–Whitney classes wi(M) ∈ Hi(M, Z2) of a manifold M are defined to be the Stiefel–Whitney classes of its tangent bundle TM.)

The bundle of spinors πS: S → M over M is then the complex vector bundle associated with the corresponding principal bundle πP: P → M of spin frames over M and the spin representation of its structure group Spin(n) on the space of spinors Δn. The bundle S is called the spinor bundle for a given spin structure on M.

A precise definition of spin structure on manifold was possible only after the notion of fiber bundle had been introduced; André Haefliger (1956) found the topological obstruction to the existence of a spin structure on an orientable Riemannian manifold and Max Karoubi (1968) extended this result to the non-orientable pseudo-Riemannian case.

Spin structures on Riemannian manifolds

Definition
A spin structure on an orientable Riemannian manifold  with an oriented vector bundle  is an equivariant lift of the orthonormal frame bundle   with respect to the double covering . In other words, a pair  is a spin structure on the SO(n)-principal bundle  when

Obstruction
Haefliger found necessary and sufficient conditions for the existence of a spin structure on an oriented Riemannian manifold (M,g). The obstruction to having a spin structure is a certain element [k] of H2(M, Z2) . For a spin structure the class [k] is the second Stiefel–Whitney class w2(M) ∈ H2(M, Z2) of M. Hence, a spin structure exists if and only if the second Stiefel–Whitney class w2(M) ∈ H2(M, Z2) of M vanishes.

Spin structures on vector bundles
Let M be a paracompact topological manifold and E an oriented vector bundle on M of dimension n equipped with a fibre metric.  This means that at each point of M, the fibre of E is an inner product space.  A spinor bundle of E is a prescription for consistently associating a spin representation to every point of M.  There are topological obstructions to being able to do it, and consequently, a given bundle E may not admit any spinor bundle.  In case it does, one says that the bundle E is spin.

This may be made rigorous through the language of principal bundles.  The collection of oriented orthonormal frames of a vector bundle form a frame bundle PSO(E), which is a principal bundle under the action of the special orthogonal group SO(n).  A spin structure for PSO(E) is a lift of PSO(E) to a principal bundle PSpin(E) under the action of the spin group Spin(n), by which we mean that there exists a bundle map  : PSpin(E) → PSO(E) such that
where  is the mapping of groups presenting the spin group as a double-cover of SO(n).

In the special case in which E is the tangent bundle TM over the base manifold M, if a spin structure exists then one says that M is a spin manifold. Equivalently M is spin if the SO(n) principal bundle of orthonormal bases of the tangent fibers of M is a Z2 quotient of a principal spin bundle.

If the manifold has a cell decomposition or a triangulation, a spin structure can equivalently be thought of as a homotopy-class of trivialization of the tangent bundle over the 1-skeleton that extends over the 2-skeleton.  If the dimension is lower than 3, one first takes a Whitney sum with a trivial line bundle.

Obstruction and classification
For an orientable vector bundle  a spin structure exists on  if and only if the second Stiefel–Whitney class  vanishes. This is a result of Armand Borel and Friedrich Hirzebruch. These results can be easily provenpg 110-111 using a spectral sequence argument for the associated principal -bundle . Notice this gives a fibrationhence the Serre spectral sequence can be applied. But, from Hurewicz theorem and change of coefficients, this is exactly the cohomology group . If it vanishes, then the inverse image of  under the mapis the set of double coverings giving spin structures.

Remarks on classification
When spin structures exist, the inequivalent spin structures on a manifold have a one-to-one correspondence (not canonical) with the elements of H1(M,Z2), which by the universal coefficient theorem is isomorphic to H1(M,Z2). More precisely, the space of the isomorphism classes of spin structures is an affine space over H1(M,Z2).

Intuitively, for each nontrivial cycle on M a spin structure corresponds to a binary choice of whether a section of the SO(N) bundle switches sheets when one encircles the loop.  If w2 vanishes then these choices may be extended over the two-skeleton, then (by obstruction theory) they may automatically be extended over all of M.  In particle physics this corresponds to a choice of periodic or antiperiodic boundary conditions for fermions going around each loop. Note that on a complex manifold  the second Stiefel-Whitney class can be computed as the first chern class .

Examples
 A genus g Riemann surface admits 22g inequivalent spin structures; see theta characteristic.
 If H2(M,Z2) vanishes, M is spin. For example, Sn is spin for all . (Note that S2 is also spin, but for different reasons; see below.)
 The complex projective plane CP2 is not spin.
 More generally, all even-dimensional complex projective spaces CP2n are not spin.
 All odd-dimensional complex projective spaces CP2n+1 are spin.
 All compact, orientable manifolds of dimension 3 or less are spin.
 All Calabi–Yau manifolds are spin.

Properties 
 The Â genus of a spin manifold is an integer, and is an even integer if in addition the dimension is 4 mod 8.
In general the Â genus is a rational invariant, defined for any manifold, but it is not in general an integer.
This was originally proven by Hirzebruch and Borel, and can be proven by the Atiyah–Singer index theorem, by realizing the Â genus as the index of a Dirac operator – a Dirac operator is a square root of a second order operator, and exists due to the spin structure being a "square root". This was a motivating example for the index theorem.

SpinC structures
A spinC structure is analogous to a spin structure on an oriented Riemannian manifold, but uses the SpinC group, which is defined instead by the exact sequence 

To motivate this, suppose that  is a complex spinor representation.  The center of U(N) consists of the diagonal elements coming from the inclusion , i.e., the scalar multiples of the identity. Thus there is a homomorphism

This will always have the element (−1,−1) in the kernel. Taking the quotient modulo this element gives the group SpinC(n). This is the twisted product

where U(1) = SO(2) = S1. In other words, the group SpinC(n) is a central extension of SO(n) by S1.

This makes the SpinC group both a bundle over the circle with fibre Spin(n), and a bundle over SO(n) with fibre a circle.

The fundamental group π1(SpinC(n)) is isomorphic to Z if n ≠ 2, and to Z ⊕ Z if n = 2.

If the manifold has a cell decomposition or a triangulation, a spinC structure can be equivalently thought of as a homotopy class of complex structure over the 2-skeleton that extends over the 3-skeleton.  Similarly to the case of spin structures, one takes a Whitney sum with a trivial line bundle if the manifold is odd-dimensional.

Obstruction
A spinC structure exists when the bundle is orientable and the second Stiefel–Whitney class of the bundle E is in the image of the map  (in other words, the third integral Stiefel–Whitney class vanishes).  In this case one says that E is spinC.  Intuitively, the lift gives the Chern class of the square of the U(1) part of any obtained spinC bundle.
By a theorem of Hopf and Hirzebruch, closed orientable 4-manifolds always admit a spinC structure.

Classification
When a manifold carries a spinC structure at all, the set of spinC structures forms an affine space. Thus, spinC-structures correspond to elements of  although not in a natural way.

Geometric picture
This has the following geometric interpretation, which is due to Edward Witten.  When the spinC structure is nonzero this square root bundle has a non-integral Chern class, which means that it fails the triple overlap condition.  In particular, the product of transition functions on a three-way intersection is not always equal to one, as is required for a principal bundle.  Instead it is sometimes −1.

This failure occurs at precisely the same intersections as an identical failure in the triple products of transition functions of the obstructed spin bundle.

The details
The above intuitive geometric picture may be made concrete as follows.  Consider the short exact sequence , where the second arrow is multiplication by 2 and the third is reduction modulo 2.  This  induces a long exact sequence on cohomology, which contains

where the second arrow is induced by multiplication by 2, the third is induced by restriction modulo 2 and the fourth is the associated Bockstein homomorphism β.

It reflects the fact that one may always locally lift an SO(n) bundle to a spin bundle, but one needs to choose a Z2 lift of each transition function, which is a choice of sign. The lift does not exist when the product of these three signs on a triple overlap is −1, which yields the Čech cohomology picture of w2.

To cancel this obstruction, one tensors this spin bundle with a U(1) bundle with the same obstruction w2.  Notice that this is an abuse of the word bundle, as neither the spin bundle nor the U(1) bundle satisfies the triple overlap condition and so neither is actually a bundle.

A legitimate U(1) bundle is classified by its Chern class, which is an element of H2(M,Z). Identify this class with the first element in the above exact sequence.  The next arrow doubles this Chern class, and so legitimate bundles will correspond to even elements in the second , while odd elements will correspond to bundles that fail the triple overlap condition.  The obstruction then is classified by the failure of an element in the second H2(M,Z) to be in the image of the arrow, which, by exactness, is classified by its image in H2(M,Z2) under the next arrow.

To cancel the corresponding obstruction in the spin bundle, this image needs to be w2.  In particular, if w2 is not in the image of the arrow, then there does not exist any U(1) bundle with obstruction equal to w2 and so the obstruction cannot be cancelled.  By exactness, w2 is in the image of the preceding arrow only if it is in the kernel of the next arrow, which we recall is the Bockstein homomorphism β.  That is, the condition for the cancellation of the obstruction is

where we have used the fact that the third integral Stiefel–Whitney class W3 is the Bockstein of the second Stiefel–Whitney class w2 (this can be taken as a definition of W3).

Integral lifts of Stiefel–Whitney classes
This argument also demonstrates that second Stiefel–Whitney class defines elements not only of Z2 cohomology but also of integral cohomology in one higher degree.  In fact this is the case for all even Stiefel–Whitney classes.  It is traditional to use an uppercase W for the resulting classes in odd degree, which are called the integral Stiefel–Whitney classes, and are labeled by their degree (which is always odd).

Examples
 All oriented smooth manifolds of dimension 4 or less are spinC.
 All almost complex manifolds are spinC.
 All spin manifolds are spinC.

Application to particle physics

In particle physics the spin–statistics theorem implies that the wavefunction of an uncharged fermion is a section of the associated vector bundle to the spin lift of an SO(N) bundle E.  Therefore, the choice of spin structure is part of the data needed to define the wavefunction, and one often needs to sum over these choices in the partition function.  In many physical theories E is the tangent bundle, but for the fermions on the worldvolumes of D-branes in string theory it is a normal bundle.

In quantum field theory charged spinors are sections of associated spinc bundles, and in particular no charged spinors can exist on a space that is not spinc.  An exception arises in some supergravity theories where additional interactions imply that other fields may cancel the third Stiefel–Whitney class. The mathematical description of spinors in supergravity and string theory is a particularly subtle open problem, which was recently addressed in references. It turns out that the standard notion of spin structure is too restrictive for applications to supergravity and string theory, and that the correct notion of spinorial structure for the mathematical formulation of these theories is a "Lipschitz structure".

See also
 Metaplectic structure
 Orthonormal frame bundle
 Spinor

References

Further reading

External links
Something on Spin Structures by Sven-S. Porst is a short introduction to orientation and spin structures for mathematics students.

Structures on Riemannian manifolds
Structures on manifolds
Algebraic topology
K-theory
Mathematical physics